Oluwadamilare Okulaja, also known as Durella (King of the Zanga), is a Nigerian recording artist, performer, songwriter and businessman. He is known for his singles, "Enu Ose", "Shayo", "Wizkolo Wiska", "Club Rock" and "GaGa" featuring Wizkid. He appeared on songs with stars such as Dbanj, Femi Kuti, Duncan Mighty, Terry G, Olamide, and Dammy Krane, and performed live with Wyclef Jean in South Africa. In 2008 Durella was awarded "MTV Base Advance Warning Artist" of the year.  He is the first Nigerian artist to own a shoe line: Durella Sneakers, named after his popular slogan "2Gbaski". Durella issued his debut album King Of The Zanga under TC- Record Label. His second album was Reconfigurated.

Early life
Durella, real name Oluwadamilare, (meaning: The Lord has rewarded me) was born in Zaria, Kaduna State. He grew up in Mushin and Ajegunle, and studied insurance before dropping out of school due to financial challenges.

Durella wrote his first song at age 13.  

He ascribed his moniker "Durella" by saying  "the street" gave it to him. Originally his nickname was Durel, but this was later changed to Durella. While he was known as Durel, he was an R&B artist and released a single titled "Why".

Career
In February 2006, at a chance meeting in the town of Ibadan, Durella met executives from TcRecords while performing at a fashion show. He signed a deal a week later. 

On his interview by CompassOnline news, he added that his other appellation is reflective of his roots. "The kind of music I play now is the music for the streets and I have termed it commercial universal street music, (if there is anything like that)."

Voice resemblance conflict
Critics have argued that Durella sounds like Dapo Oyebanji, popularly known as D'banj. But Durella disagrees, saying: "The most important element that makes you a musician is the lyrical content on your music. You must also be very versatile and be sure to get returns on investment. These three things make you stand out. If you don't have them, you can't even sell ten copies. All I know is that I am me, so there is no basis for comparison with D'banj."

His musical prowess was attested by his victory at the Airtel (formerly Zain)/MTV Advance Warning Competition where he won $50,000 with the song, "Life in Zanga". He said: "Obviously, that exposed me to a whole new world of opportunities. Out of twenty-six artistes that participated, we were shortlisted to thirteen stellar cast of talented musicians including Kel, MI, Soty etc before I emerged the winner. With that, I believe that I'm not just a fluke, I have the talent and I'm harnessing it."

Durella recorded the song "Enu o se", "it is better to go all out to get whatever you want than paying lip service".

Discography
Singles:
 Enu Ose
 Wiskolowiska
 Club Rock
 Life In The Zanga
 Shayo
 My LIfe
 Tonight
 Mari (2015)
 Kack It Up (2015)

Collaborations:
Durella has collaborated with various stars like:
 D'banj Ibadi E Featuring Olamide, Durella and Kay Switch
 Nkiruka featuring Duncan Mighty
 Buddy Hanging featuring Olamide
 My Life featuring Terry G
 Gaga Featuring Wizkid (2011)
 Jahbless - Joor Oh Remix Featuring Ice Prince, Reminisce, Durella, Ruggedman & Eldee (2011)
 Don't Go Funny Featuring Timaya (2011)
 2 Casket - Quest Featuring Durella (2013)
 HCode – Monster (Remix) Featuring Olamide, Durella, Dammy Krane & Shobzy.

References

21st-century Nigerian male singers
Living people
Year of birth missing (living people)